The 1872 Prohibition National Convention was a presidential nominating convention held at Comstock's Opera House, in Columbus, Ohio on February 22, 1872, to select the presidential ticket for the 1872 presidential election. It was the first presidential nominating convention of the newly organized Prohibition Party and would continue nominating presidential candidates in every presidential election leading it to become the longest continuous third party in the United States.

Presidential nomination

On December 9, 1871, a national convention was called to occur on February 22, 1872, by the National Prohibition Committee and was attended by 194 delegates. Simeon B. Chase was selected as the chairman of the party after being introduced by incumbent Chairman John Russell. 

The delegates at the convention proposed Chairman Simeon B. Chase, Chief Justice Salmon P. Chase, former Liberty Party presidential nominee Gerrit Smith, former Portland Mayor Neal Dow, Major general Benjamin Butler, Justice David Davis, James Black, Horace Greeley, and John Russell as presidential nominees and Henry Fish, James Black, John Blackman, Secretary Gideon T. Stewart, Julius A. Spencer, John Russell, and Stephen B. Ransom for the vice presidential nomination. 

The candidates were sent to a special committee and it chose James Black for the presidential nomination and former Chairman John Russell for the vice presidential nomination. The committee rejected Greeley, who had won the nominations of both the Liberal Republican and Democratic parties,  for not being supportive of women's suffrage and Butler for his stances on alcoholic prohibition; Black and Russell were sent back to the delegates and approved by acclamation.

References

Prohibition Party
1872 conferences
1872 United States presidential election